The Unity Chapel is located in town of Wyoming in Iowa County, Wisconsin United States. It was added to the National Register of Historic Places in 1974.

History
Unity Chapel was designed in Joseph Lyman Silsbee's Chicago architectural office in 1886. Silsbee was one of the leading practitioners of Shingle style architecture in the Midwest and designed the chapel as a simple execution of this style. Although not officially in the employ of Silsbee, eighteen-year-old Frank Lloyd Wright "looked after the interior." This makes the chapel Wright's earliest known work. The chapel was designed for Wright's uncle, Jenkin Lloyd Jones, to serve as a private chapel for his surrounding Lloyd Jones relatives. Jenkin Lloyd Jones had commissioned Silsbee to design his All Souls Church in Chicago the previous year. The chapel grounds include the family cemetery.

After Unity Chapel was built, Wright moved to Chicago and joined the employ of Silsbee.

The building was recognized by the National Park Service with a listing on the National Register of Historic Places on July 18, 1974.

Architecture
The chapel is a small building shaped in a reversed "L"; the short leg points north and the long leg points east. The short leg operated as an entryway and the long leg is the main chapel hall. The hipped roof is steeply-pitched and features a belfry at the intersection of the gables. The belfry is square with a bell-cast hipped roof. Each of its four sides has a semi-circular arched opening. Consistent with Shingle style design architecture, a layer of wood shingles covers both the roof and the exterior walls. Unity Chapel rests on a rock-faced stone foundation. Double-hung windows in groups of three are found on the north, south, and west walls. The upper sash has twelve lights and the lower sash is one large pane.

The chapel graveyard holds the remains of Wright's side of the family, the Lloyd Joneses. Wright himself was originally buried there, but his remains were moved to the grounds of his winter home, Taliesin West, in Arizona on the wishes of his widow following her death in 1985.

References

 Storrer, William Allin. The Frank Lloyd Wright Companion. University Of Chicago Press, 2006,  (S.000)

External links
Website about the Unity Chapel and the Lloyd Jones family (which included Frank Lloyd Wright)

Properties of religious function on the National Register of Historic Places in Wisconsin
Chapels in the United States
Buildings and structures in Iowa County, Wisconsin
Shingle Style church buildings
Churches completed in 1886
Unitarian Universalist churches in Wisconsin
Welsh-American history
National Register of Historic Places in Iowa County, Wisconsin
1886 establishments in Wisconsin
Shingle Style architecture in Wisconsin